The Girenspitz (2,394 m) is a mountain in the Rätikon range of the Alps, located north of Schiers in the Swiss canton of Graubünden. It is the culminating poing of the group lying between the valleys of the Taschinasbach and the Schraubach.

References

External links
 Girenspitz on Hikr

Mountains of the Alps
Mountains of Switzerland
Mountains of Graubünden
Two-thousanders of Switzerland